Francesco Pomi (5 January 1905 – 22 May 1984) was an Italian professional footballer, who played as a defender.

External links 
Profile at MagliaRossonera.it 

1905 births
1984 deaths
Italian footballers
Association football defenders
Serie A players
A.C. Milan players